Lauchlan McGillivray (died 1880) was a 19th-century Member of Parliament from Southland, New Zealand.

He represented the Riverton electorate from 1870 to 1875, when he was defeated. In 1871, he was the first mayor of Riverton when he was elected unopposed.

References

Year of birth missing
1880 deaths
Members of the New Zealand House of Representatives
Unsuccessful candidates in the 1875–1876 New Zealand general election
New Zealand MPs for South Island electorates
Mayors of places in Southland, New Zealand
19th-century New Zealand politicians